Cambria Freight Station, also known as Christiansburg Depot, is a historic freight station located at Christiansburg, Montgomery County, Virginia, US. It was built in 1868–1869, and is a wood-framed, one-story, U-shaped structure with a shallow hipped roof and deeply overhanging eaves in the Italianate style. A portion of the center section rises to form a tower-like second-story room, covered with an even shallower hipped roof. A long, one-story freight section extending eastward from the rear. The building also served as a passenger station, until Christiansburg station was built nearby in 1906. The building houses a local history museum known as the Cambria Depot Museum.

It was listed on the National Register of Historic Places in 1985. It is located in the Cambria Historic District.

References

External links

New River Heritage Coalition: Cambria Depot Museum

History museums in Virginia
Railway stations on the National Register of Historic Places in Virginia
Italianate architecture in Virginia
Buildings and structures completed in 1869
Norfolk and Western Railway stations
Buildings and structures in Montgomery County, Virginia
National Register of Historic Places in Montgomery County, Virginia
Individually listed contributing properties to historic districts on the National Register in Virginia
1869 establishments in Virginia